Bedford, New York, may refer to:
Bedford (town), New York, a town in Westchester County
Bedford (CDP), New York, commonly known as Bedford Village, a hamlet (and census-designated place or CDP) in the town of Bedford
Bedford Hills, New York, a hamlet
Bedford–Stuyvesant, Brooklyn, a neighborhood
Bedford, a neighborhood within Bedford–Stuyvesant